Countryside Live is the sister event of the annual farming and rural showcase, the Great Yorkshire Show. Held each October at the Great Yorkshire Showground in the town of Harrogate, England, the two-day event is designed to act as a shop window for the farming industry and is open to the public. The show has been organised by the Yorkshire Agricultural Society every year since it was first held in 2001.

There are competitive classes for cattle, sheep, poultry, pigeons, horses, ponies, and pigs. The region’s Young Farmers' Club take an active part in the show, organising a Tug of War championship and stock judging competitions. There are demonstrations of country skills such as dry stone walling and forestry. Around the site is a wide range of stands selling local food and drink. Other attractions include a fruit and vegetable show, honey show, dog agility, hands-on activities for children, Diggerland, archery, and ferret racing.

Graham & Tina Fletcher also search for the next Talented Show Jumper, where young riders compete for the title in the indoor Show Jumping Arena.

History
Countryside Live began in 2001 and has been held annually since then. The first event was launched after the outbreak of Foot and Mouth disease.

2008 
In 2008, equine classes were added to the program and have proved popular. Demonstrations of horsemanship and show jumping master classes are given by ex-Olympic equestrian Graham Fletcher and his wife, Tina, an International Show Jumper.

2009 
The 2009 show, held on 24 and 25 October, introduced several new competitive classes. These included farriery, classes for both modern and traditional breeds of pigs, and classes for novice horse riders.

2010 
In 2010, a record crowd of 10,221 visitors attended the event. Over all there were 226 entries in the equine section. The two-day event took place on 23 and 24 October 2010.

2011 
The "Festival of British Fruit" was held at the show in 2011. This is an annual event, which was also celebrating its ninth year. It is organised by the Marden Fruit Society, based in Kent, and is held at a different location each year. More than 25 different varieties of apples and nine varieties of pears were on show, with visitors being invited to choose their favourite, although the final selection of "Britain's Tastiest Apple" was decided by a panel of experts. The annual search for a young show-jumping star was judged by Graham and Tina Fletcher, and the environmental charity BTCV, now The Conservation Volunteers, gave a small tree to everyone who attended the show. Special venues for the benefit of young children included The StoryBarn and a farmyard experience area. The show was attended by around 10,700 visitors.

2012 
Countryside Live celebrated its tenth annual anniversary in 2012, when the show was attended by 12,601 visitors. 
 The show was welcomed by the agricultural community, as the Great Yorkshire Show had been cancelled earlier in the year due to heavy rain and flooding. In order to attract visitors, a number of new events were added to the programme. These included the final of the Northern Show Cross horse-riding event. The junior novice event was won by a 14-year-old girl from Scarborough, while the senior novice event was won by a 74-year-old man from Monk Fryston. The event consists of traditional show jumping and cross-country jumps. Other first-time events at the show included a mountain biking demonstration to show the importance of riding bikes responsibly in the countryside, an appearance by Carol and Phillip Mellin and their sheepdog Jess, from the ITV television programme The Dales; and the Knaresborough Horticultural Society’s Flower and Vegetable show, which attracted over 70 entries. In addition, the Rare Breeds Survival Trust attended the show for the first time. They are a conservation charity aiming to prevent the extinction of native farm-animal breeds.

There were more than 3,000 entries in the sheep and cattle classes, an increase from the 400 entries at the first show in 2001.

2013 

The 11th annual event will be held on Saturday 19 and Sunday 20 October 2013.  New for 2013 are Private Driving Arena Trials (Sat only) and the return of the Northern Show Cross Final (Sat only).

References

External links
Countryside Live website

Agricultural shows in Yorkshire
Events in Harrogate
2001 establishments in England
Festivals established in 2001